Matilda of Andechs (died 1245) was a daughter of Margrave Berthold I of Istria and his first wife, Hedwig of Dachau-Wittelsbach, daughter of the Bavarian Count palatine Otto IV of Scheyern.

Matilda married Count Engelbert III of Gorizia (d. 1220). They had one son: Meinhard, who would inherit the title of Duke of Merania after the death of the childless Duke Otto II.  However, by then this title was meaningless, as the Istrian and Carniolan marches had passed to the Patriarchate of Aquileia, and the original Andechs estates had been seized by the Bavarian dukes.

References

Sources

German countesses
Year of birth unknown
1245 deaths
13th-century women of the Holy Roman Empire
House of Andechs